Raiders of the Lost Car Park is a novel by British author Robert Rankin. It is the second book in the Cornelius Murphy trilogy, sequel to The Book of Ultimate Truths and prequel to The Most Amazing Man Who Ever Lived. It documents the continuing adventures of Cornelius Murphy and his companion Tuppe. The novel was first published by Doubleday in 1994. The book's name is a play on Raiders of the Lost Ark, an Indiana Jones movie.

References 

Novels by Robert Rankin
1994 British novels
British fantasy novels
Doubleday (publisher) books